Craigieburn railway station is the terminus of the suburban electrified Craigieburn line in Victoria, Australia. It serves the northern Melbourne suburb of Craigieburn, and opened on 22 July 1872.

History
The railway through Craigieburn opened in 1872, as part of the North East line to School House Lane. When the station opened, there was a small timber station building, which was replaced by a larger building in 1878, having the same design as other small stations on the line. In 1874, the station opened to goods traffic. In 1920, a larger timber station building was constructed on Platform 1.

The station originally had a passing loop, which was used regularly to cross trains until the line was duplicated in 1886. In 1899, a lever frame was provided on the down platform, which was moved to the new station building in 1922. A number of goods sidings were provided at the station, with the last siding removed in 1982. In 1961, the old Hume Highway road overpass opened, replacing a level crossing, as part of the construction of the North East standard gauge project. In 1975, the former sheep and cattle races at the station were abolished. In 1988, the signal box was closed, all signals were removed, and the station was abolished as a block post. In 1996, a small building was constructed on Platform 1, housing a kiosk and ticket facilities.

In 2007, the station was rebuilt as a Premium Station, as part of the extension of electrified services from Broadmeadows, with a signal box, stabling sidings and a crossover between lines also provided. On 30 September of that year, former train operator Connex began services to and from the station.

In March 2009, Platform 1 was demolished and rebuilt to a similar design to Platform 2. The track on Platform 1 was also electrified, and additional crossovers were provided at the up and down ends of the station, to allow down trains to diverge to the up line.

On 4 May 2010, a collision between a Comeng train set and a Kilmore East-bound quarry train, led by Pacific National locomotive G524, occurred between Roxburgh Park and Craigieburn.

Train maintenance facility
On 9 April 2012, a new train maintenance facility, located to the north of the station, was officially opened by then Minister for Public Transport, Terry Mulder.

Platforms and services
Craigieburn has two side platforms. It is served by Craigieburn line trains and V/Line Seymour line services. Suburban services generally use Platform 2, with northbound V/Line services often crossing to Platform 1 to pass suburban trains.

Platform 1:
  all stations services to Flinders Street
  V/Line services to Seymour and Southern Cross (set down only)

Platform 2:
  all stations services to Flinders Street
  V/Line services to Seymour (pick up only)

Transport links
Dysons operates two bus routes to and from Craigieburn station, under contract to Public Transport Victoria:
 : to Mernda station
 : to Donnybrook station

Kastoria Bus Lines operates six routes to and from Craigieburn station, under contract to Public Transport Victoria:
 : to Craigieburn Central Shopping Centre
 : to Craigieburn North
 : to Broadmeadows station
 : to Craigieburn North
 : to Craigieburn West
 : to Roxburgh Park station

Gallery

References

External links

 Melway map at street-directory.com.au

Premium Melbourne railway stations
Railway stations in Melbourne
Railway stations in Australia opened in 1872
Railway stations in the City of Hume